Pinjar (Punjabi: ਪਿੰਜਰ; English/Translation: The Skeleton) is a 1950 Punjabi-language novel written by notable Indian poet and novelist Amrita Pritam. It is the story of a Hindu girl, Puro, abducted by a Muslim man, Rashid; Puro's parents refuse to accept the defiled girl when she manages to escape from Rashid's home. Pinjar is widely considered one of the outstanding works of Indian fiction set during the period of the Partition of India.

Main characters

 Puro (later, Hamida)
 Rashid
 Ramchand
 Lajo
 Trilok
 Rajjo
 Tara (Puro's Mother)
 Mohanlal (Puro's Father)
 Shyamlal (Ramchand's Father)
 Pagali
 Javed

Adaptation
The novel was adapted in the 2003 Hindi film of the same title (Pinjar), starring Urmila Matondkar, Manoj Bajpai and Sanjay Suri in the lead roles. After receiving critical acclaim, the film went on to win the National Film Award for Best Feature Film on National Integration. A Pakistani television series based on the novel titled Ghughi premiered on 25 January 2018 on TVOne Pakistan.

References 

Punjabi-language novels
1950 novels
Indian novels adapted into films
Novels about Indian women
Partition of India in fiction
1950 Indian novels